Qeshlaq-e Nareh Kesh (also Romanized as Qeshlāq-e Nareh Kesh; also known as Na‘reh Kesh) is a village in Qeshlaq Rural District, Abish Ahmad District, Kaleybar County, East Azerbaijan Province, Iran. At the 2006 census, its population was 88, in 19 families.

References 

Populated places in Kaleybar County